Lesmond Prinsen (born 18 June 1973) is a retired football defender from the Netherlands. He played professional football for thirteen years, for BV Veendam, FC Emmen and FC Omniworld.

References
  Profile

1973 births
Living people
Dutch footballers
FC Emmen players
SC Veendam players
Almere City FC players
Sportspeople from Heerenveen
Association football defenders
Footballers from Friesland